Luca Fabrizio is a Grand Prix motorcycle racer from Italy. He races in the Italian CIV Moto3 Championship aboard a Honda NSF250R. He is the younger brother of Michel Fabrizio.

Career statistics

By season

Races by year
(key)

References

External links
 Profile on motogp.com

Italian motorcycle racers
1992 births
Living people
125cc World Championship riders
Sportspeople from Rome